DWT may stand for:

 Discrete wavelet transform, a mathematical procedure in numerical analysis and functional analysis
 Driving While Texting, Is the act of composing, sending, or reading text messages, email, or making other similar use of the internet on a mobile device, while operating a motor vehicle, such as an automobile, truck or train. 
 Dry weight
 D'Arcy Wentworth Thompson, a scholar
 Deadweight tons/tonnage, an expression of a ship's carrying capacity, including the weight of the crew, passengers, cargo, fuel, ballast, drinking water, and stores.
 Deep Web Technologies, a software company that specializes in mining the deep Web
 Detroit–Windsor Tunnel, a highway connecting Michigan with Ontario
 Drowned World Tour, a 2001 concert tour by American entertainer Madonna
 Davis Wright Tremaine, a national business and litigation law firm representing clients in the United States and in China.
 Dangerous World Tour, a 1992–93 concert tour by Michael Jackson
 Dorset Wildlife Trust, a wildlife trust covering the county of Dorset, United Kingdom
 Diamonds World Tour, a concert tour by Rihanna
 Dynamic Web TWAIN, a TWAIN-based scanning SDK software specifically designed for web applications
 Dangerous Woman Tour, a 2017 concert tour by Ariana Grande

dwt may refer to:
 Pennyweight, a unit of mass used in measuring the weight of gold

.dwt is a file extension used by several programs, including:
 Adobe Dreamweaver Template
 Dynamic Web Template, a Microsoft FrontPage feature
 AutoCAD Template/Prototype